__NoTOC__
The 1937 Australian referendum was held on 6 March 1937. It contained two referendum questions.

Results in detail

Aviation
This section is an excerpt from 1937 Australian referendum (Aviation) § Results

Marketing
This section is an excerpt from 1937 Australian referendum (Marketing) § Results

See also
Referendums in Australia
Politics of Australia
History of Australia

References

Further reading
  
 .
 Australian Electoral Commission (2007) Referendum Dates and Results 1906 – Present AEC, Canberra.

1937 referendums
1937
Referendum
March 1937 events